Reflections is a compilation album by American country duo The Judds. It was released on August 16, 1994 via Curb and RCA Nashville. It was mostly produced by Brent Maher, but also included some assistance from Don Potter. Reflections was The Judds's sixth compilation release in their career and among several to reach a charting position on a Billboard survey.

Background, content and release
Reflections was recorded in several sessions between 1985 and 1989. It was produced by Brent Maher and Don Potter. Reflections was released three years after The Judds had disbanded as a duo. The duo had 14 number one country singles in the 1980s. In 1991, they ended their musical partnership after Naomi Judd was diagnosed with Hepatitis C. In the years that followed, their former labels (Curb/RCA) would issue several more compilation albums, including reflections. 

The album contained a total of eight tracks. Three of the songs had previously been hit singles: "Grandpa (Tell Me 'Bout the Good Old Days)," "Guardian Angels" and "Love Can Build a Bridge." Five of the additional tracks were songs previously included on The Judds' following studio albums: Heartland and River of Time. The fourth track was a gospel song entitled "When King Jesus Calls His Children Home," which had not been previously issued on an album. 

Reflections was released on August 16, 1994 via Curb and RCA Records. It was the duo's sixth compilation release. It was issued as both a compact disc and a cassette. The album spent one week on the Billboard Top Country Albums chart in 1995, peaking at number 66. It was one of several Judds compilations to appear on the country albums chart. Reflections was later reviewed by Allmusic, who gave it 4.5 out of 5 stars.

Track listing

Compact disc version

Cassette version

Personnel
All credits are adapted from the liner notes of Reflections.

Musical and technical personnel
 Susan Eddy – art direction
 Naomi Judd – harmony vocals
 Wynonna Judd – lead vocals
 Brent Maher – producer
 Jim McGuire – photography
 Grffin Norman – design
 Don Potter – assistant producer (tracks 1, 6)

Chart performance

Release history

References

1994 compilation albums
Curb Records compilation albums
The Judds compilation albums
RCA Records compilation albums